Durğan (also, Durqan and Durgan) is a village and municipality in the Lerik Rayon of Azerbaijan.  It has a population of 441.

References 

Populated places in Lerik District